or (アイヌ絵 Ainu-e) is the Japanese art historical term for depictions of Ainu by Wajin, prevalent from the mid-Edo period to the early Meiji period (eighteenth and nineteenth centuries). The preliterate Ainu had no painting tradition of their own.

Typical subjects include myths and legends, rituals, encounters with wajin, hunting, fishing, and forms of entertainment.

See also

 Ishūretsuzō
 Namban art
 Orientalism

References

Japanese painting
Ainu